Per Spett (born  in Jukkasjärvi) is a Swedish freestyle skier, musician, specializing in  moguls.

Spett competed at the 2006 and 2010 Winter Olympics for Sweden. Both times he did not advance to the moguls final, finishing 23rd in the preliminaries.

As of February 2013, his best showing at the World Championships is 8th, in 2009.

Spett made his World Cup debut in December 2003. As of February 2013, his best performance at a World Cup event is 5th, in a dual moguls event at Are in 2011/12. His best World Cup overall finish is 13th, in 2011/12.

When not skiing, Spett works in an iron ore mine in Kiruna.

References

1985 births
Living people
Olympic freestyle skiers of Sweden
Freestyle skiers at the 2006 Winter Olympics
Freestyle skiers at the 2010 Winter Olympics
Freestyle skiers at the 2014 Winter Olympics
People from Kiruna Municipality
Swedish male freestyle skiers
Sportspeople from Norrbotten County
21st-century Swedish people